The acronym BUSC can stand for one of two things:

British United Services Club of Los Angeles
British Universities Snowsports Council